KylieFever2002 is a live album by Australian singer-songwriter Kylie Minogue. It was released in the limited edition DVD version of the tour. It had all of the tour on apart from the 'Cybertronica' act, "GBI" and "Burning Up".

Track listing

External links
Kylie's website
Kylie's Twitter
Tour pics
More tour pics

References

Kylie Minogue live albums
2002 live albums
Parlophone live albums